How to Be Drawn is a poetry collection by Terrance Hayes. The poems take on themes of racial individuality, social prejudices, and personal losses in everyday life. The main focus of the poems are self care for an individual's image or personal hardships. The collection was a finalist for several awards. It was first published in 2015 by the Penguin Group.

Theme and style
The major themes that coincide in this collection are those of racial and social injustices. Other themes throughout this work are violence, family troubles, and everyday personal loss. Hayes surveys, throughout this collection, how people see and how people are seen by others. The collection draws inspiration from other works of art, from novels to music to games. In "How to Be Drawn to Trouble", the poem features lyrics from James Brown to explore the pressures of matrimonial and familial hungers. In the poem "How to Draw an Invisible Man", Hayes analyzes what it means to be invisible but also visible in America. Trevor Ketner, writing in The Rumpus, said that it "echoes the cultural critique of race relations in America" he found in Ralph Ellison's work Invisible Man.

The poems are written in free verse, meaning there is no set rhyme scheme, stanza form, or metrical structure. The diction used throughout the collection is conversational and Hayes uses word play to convey the message that he has for each of his poems, instead of drawing away using rhythm or rhyme. Poet Tess Taylor noted that "his writing is full of puns and fake outs, leads and dodges, all encased in muscular music."

Poems

I. Troubled Bodies

 What It Look Like
 The Deer
 How to Be Drawn to Trouble
 New York Poem
 As Traffic
 Wigphrastic
 My Life as a Hammer
 Gentle Measures
 A Concept of Survival
 Who Are the Tribes

II. Invisible Souls

 Black Confederate Ghost Story
 How to Draw an Invisible Man
 Barberism
 The Carpenter Ant
 American Sonnet for Wanda C.
 Like Mercy
 A Machine
 Portrait of Etheridge Knight in the Style of a Crime Report: Part I
 Portrait of Etheridge Knight in the Style of a Crime Report: Part II
 Portrait of Etheridge Knight in the Style of a Crime Report: Part III
 Elegy with Zombies for Life
 Instructions for a Séance with the Vladimirs

III. A Circling Mind

 The Rose Has Teeth
 Antebellum House Party
 Reconstructed Reconstruction 
 We Should Make a Documentary About Spades
 For Crying Out Loud
 Model Prison Model
 Some Maps to Indicate Pittsburgh
 New Jersey Poem
 Self-Portrait as the Mind of a Camera
 How to Draw a Perfect Circle
 Ars Poetica for the Ones Like Us

Awards
How to Be Drawn was a finalist for the 2015 National Book Award for Poetry and the National Book Critics Circle Award. It was the winner of the 2016 NAACP Image Award for Outstanding Literary Work - Poetry.

External links 
 Terrance Hayes on "How to Be Drawn" at the 2017 AWP Book Fair
 Terrance Hayes speaking about "How to Be Drawn" at Politics and Prose Bookstore, Washington, DC, May 16, 2015

References

2015 poetry books
American poetry collections
Penguin Books